Ron Ryckman can refer to:

 Ron Ryckman Jr. (born 1971), Speaker of the Kansas House of Representatives
 Ron Ryckman Sr. (born 1948), Kansas state senator and former Kansas House of Representatives member, and father of Ron Ryckman Jr.